Emeka Christian Eze (born 22 December 1992) is a Nigerian footballer who plays for Al Masry SC as a defensive midfielder.

Club career
Eze started his career at Inter Enugu, a futsal side, where he played for 3 years before switching to association football, where he was signed for Enugu Rangers.

International career
Eze had his international debut in a friendly match against Mexico on 31 May 2013. He was selected for Nigeria's squad at the 2013 FIFA Confederations Cup.

References

External links
 
 

1992 births
Living people
Nigerian footballers
Nigeria international footballers
Association football midfielders
2013 FIFA Confederations Cup players
Sportspeople from Ibadan